Patrick Kingsley (born June 1989) is a British journalist who is the Jerusalem bureau chief of The New York Times. He previously served as a foreign correspondent for The Guardian.

Early life and education 
Kingsley was born in London in June 1989. He graduated with a first in English Literature from the University of Cambridge, and a journalism diploma from the National Council for the Training of Journalists.

Career 
Kingsley joined The Guardian in 2010. He was appointed the paper’s first-ever migration correspondent in 2015.

He was named foreign affairs journalist of the year at the 2015 British Journalism Awards for his coverage of the European refugee crisis.

Based on his work in the field, he authored 'The New Odyssey: The Story of Europe's Refugee Crisis', which was published in 2016 by Guardian Faber.

Kingsley joined The New York Times as Istanbul bureau chief in 2017 until he was made an international correspondent based out of Berlin.

According to his online biography, Kingsley speaks Arabic and is studying Hebrew.

References 

Living people
The New York Times people
The Guardian journalists
Alumni of the University of Cambridge
1989 births
British newspaper people
British newspaper journalists
People educated at Eton College